The Flettner Fl 265 was an experimental helicopter designed by Anton Flettner.

Design and development
This helicopter, developed in 1938 with the support of Nazi Germany's Kriegsmarine, made it possible, for the first time, to transition from powered rotary-wing flight to autorotation and back again, making it the safest helicopter of its time. In contrast to the Fl 185, the Fl 265, believed to be the pioneering example of a synchropter, had two intermeshing rotors 12 m in diameter, powered by a 160 hp (119 kW) BMW-Bramo Sh 14 A radial engine in the nose of the fuselage, fitted with a fan to assist cooling. Six helicopters were constructed, but series production was curtailed in favour of the Flettner Fl 282.

Operators

Luftwaffe

Specifications (Fl 265)

See also
 Kaman K-125

Notes

References

 Nowarra, Heinz J.: Die Deutsche Luftrüstung 1933-1945, Bernard & Graefe Verlag, Koblenz 1993,

External links

Fl 265 entry at the Lexikon der Wehrmacht website (in German)
1941 German Helicopter Development — Fa 223 and Fl 265 film
Flettner Fl 265 in scale of 1 : 4.6 as shown at the Helicopter Museum of Bückeburg

1930s German experimental aircraft
World War II helicopters of Germany
1930s German helicopters
Flettner aircraft
Synchropters
Single-engined piston helicopters
Aircraft first flown in 1939